Maha Aungmye Bonzan Monastery, commonly known as the Me Nu Brick Monastery, is a historic Buddhist monastery in Inwa, Mandalay Region, Myanmar (formerly Burma).

The monastery was built by Queen Nanmadaw Me Nu in 1818 to serve as the residence of her religious preceptor, the Nyaunggan Sayadaw U Po. Then offered to the 2nd Nyaunggan Sayardaw U Bok. The monastery was damaged by the earthquake of 1838 but was repaired in 1873 by his daughter Hsinbyumashin. This monastery is one of the finest specimens of Myanmar architecture during the Konbaung Period (19th century). Its architecture is in simulation of wooden monasteries with multiple roofs and a prayer hall of seven-tiered superstructure.

See also 

 Kyaung

References 

Monasteries in Myanmar
Buildings and structures in Mandalay Region
19th-century Buddhist temples
Religious buildings and structures completed in 1818